Surrey Hills  was to be a reality TV show set in Surrey, England, but it was canned in early production.

Filming was to take place in the affluent Surrey towns of Weybridge, Esher, Cobham, Leatherhead and other locations around Elmbridge and Mole Valley as well as Reigate. Comparisons had been drawn to other "docusoaps" following wealthy individuals such as The Only Way Is Essex and Made in Chelsea, but it never made the cut.

Cast

Filming
Filming was set to take place around the home towns of the main cast around Elmbridge including, Esher, Cobham, Weybridge, Leatherhead and other locations in Surrey where various events would take place.

References

British reality television series